Les Strand (born Leslie Strandt 1925-2002) was an American jazz organist.  He was considered a pioneer, Jimmy Smith referred to him as "the Art Tatum of the organ".

Recordings
 Les Strand at the Baldwin Organ (Fantasy 3231, 1956)
 Plays Jazz Classics on the Baldwin Organ (Fantasy 3242, 1956)
 Plays Duke Ellington (On the Hammond Organ) (Fantasy 3256, 1958)
 The Winners: Les Strand & the Yamaha with Their Friends, Barney Kessel & Shelly Manne (Yamaha, 196?)

References

1925 births
2002 deaths